

Group 4 

All times are local

4